KOWN-LP is a low-power broadcast radio station licensed to Omaha, Nebraska. The station currently runs under the name "95.7 The Boss." The station airs an urban contemporary format, as a competitor to rhythmic contemporary rival KOPW.

The station's transmitter is located atop the Benson apartment tower at North 60th Street and Northwest Radial Highway, northwest of downtown Omaha.

References

External links
 Official website
 

OWN-LP
Radio stations established in 2017
Urban contemporary radio stations in the United States
2017 establishments in Nebraska
OWN-LP